Jamb, also known as Jam, is a village in Parbhani taluka of Parbhani district of Maharashtra state in India.

Demography
According to the 2011 census of India, Jamb had a population of 4835, of which 2485 were male and 2350 were female. The average sex ratio of the village was 946, which was above than the Maharashtra state average of 929. The literacy rate was 70.74% compared to 82.3% for the state. The male literacy rate was 80% while the female literacy rate was 60%.

References

Villages in Parbhani district